Koerberia sonomensis, the Sonoma koerberia lichen, is a dark olive-green foliose lichen found in western North America mountains, Mediterranean areas of Europe, northern Africa and in the Sonoran Desert. The upper surface is dark olive-green sometimes striped, and the lower surface is pale olive-green. The fruiting forms (apothecia) are flat to slightly convex, and deep red-brown. It is in the Koerberia genus in the Placynthiaceae family.

References

Peltigerales
Lichen species
Lichens of Southeastern Europe
Lichens of North Africa
Lichens of North America
Taxa named by Edward Tuckerman